The  was a Mayan Revival-style hotel in Nishinomiya, Hyōgo, Japan, constructed by Arata Endo, a disciple of Frank Lloyd Wright.

History
The architectural style is heavily influenced by the Imperial Hotel, Tokyo. Even though the original Imperial Hotel by Wright does not exist anymore, the Kōshien Hotel gives an idea how the building must have felt like.

The Kōshien Hotel opened in 1930. From 1944, it was used as an Imperial Navy hospital, and in 1945 it became used as accommodation for the US military.

In 1965, it was donated to Mukogawa Women's University, and was refurbished internally and externally. It is now part of the department of architecture campus.

References

External links

 Mukogawa Women's University Koshien Kaikan 

Hotels in Hyōgo Prefecture
Mayan Revival architecture
Art Deco architecture in Japan
Hotel buildings completed in 1930
Hotels established in 1930